Kokaideu Bindaas is a 2019 romantic drama film released in the Assamese language.

Cast 
Gunjan Bhardwaj
Nikumoni Boru
Zabir Saeed
Alismita Goswami
Janu Nath
Mintu Borua
Jayanta Das
Monuj Borkotoky
Pori Mahanta
Doly Thakuriya
Dharmaram Deka
Gupamoni Gogoi

Music 

 Moina Bakhor - Zubeen Garg

References

External links
 

2019 films
2010s Assamese-language films
2019 romantic drama films
Indian romantic drama films